Dawn Nicole Lirio Macandili-Catindig (born June 1, 1996) is a Filipino volleyball athlete. She is a member of the Philippines women's national volleyball team. She played in the UAAP for the De La Salle University Lady Spikers for 5 seasons (76-80), and is currently playing in the Premier Volleyball League for the F2 Logistics Cargo Movers.

Personal life
Macandili is a graduate of AB Psychology at De La Salle University.

On March 2023, she married her boyfriend, Diego Catindig.

Career
Macandili was the first libero in the Philippines to receive a Most Valuable Player award when she won the award in the 2016 Philippine Super Liga All-Filipino Conference.

She is also a member of the Philippine National Women's Volleyball Team that played in the 2017 Asian Women's Volleyball Championship, where in she was hailed as the 2nd Best Libero. She also played in the Kuala Lumpur, Malaysia for the 29th Southeast Asian Games replacing the injured player Dennise Lazaro.

With F2 Logistics Cargo Movers, Macandili won the 2017 PSL Grand Prix Conference championship and was awarded the Best Libero.

Macandili won finals MVP award during UAAP Season 80, winning their third consecutive title.

Clubs
  Meralco Power Spikers (2014-2015)
  F2 Logistics Cargo Movers (2016–present)

Awards

Individual

Local
 UAAP Juniors Season 75 "Best Libero"
 UAAP Season 78 "Best Digger"
 UAAP Season 78 "Best Receiver"
 2016 PSL All-Filipino Conference "Best Libero"
 2016 PSL All-Filipino Conference "Most Valuable Player"
 2016 PSL Grand Prix Conference "Best Libero"
 UAAP Season 79 "Best Receiver"
 2017 PSL Grand Prix Conference "Best Libero"
 UAAP Season 80 "Finals MVP"
 2018 PSL Invitational Cup "Best Libero"
 2019 PSL Grand Prix Conference "Best Libero"
 2021 PNVF Champions League for Women "Best Libero"
 2022 Premier Volleyball League Open Conference "Best Libero"

International
 2017 Asian Women's Volleyball Championships "2nd Best Libero"
 2019 ASEAN Grand Prix – Second Leg "Best Libero"

Others
 Gawad Lasalyano (2017)
 Philippine Sports Association Miss Volleyball (2017)

Collegiate
 2014 UAAP Season 76 -  Silver medal, with  De La Salle Lady Spikers
 2015 UAAP Season 77 -  Silver medal, with  De La Salle Lady Spikers
 2016 UAAP Season 78 -  Champion, with  De La Salle Lady Spikers
 2017 UAAP Season 79 -  Champion, with  De La Salle Lady Spikers
 2018 UAAP Season 80 -  Champion, with  De La Salle Lady Spikers

Club
 2016 PSL All-Filipino Conference -  Champion, with F2 Logistics Cargo Movers
 2016 PSL Grand Prix Conference -  Bronze medal, with F2 Logistics Cargo Movers
 2017 PSL All-Filipino Conference -  Runner-up with F2 Logistics Cargo Movers
 2017 PSL Grand Prix Conference -  Champion, with F2 Logistics Cargo Movers
 2018 PSL Invitational Cup -  Champion, with F2 Logistics Cargo Movers
 2019 PSL Grand Prix Conference -  Runner-up with F2 Logistics Cargo Movers
 2019 PSL Grand Prix Conference -  Champion, with F2 Logistics Cargo Movers
 2021 PNVF Champions League for Women -  Champion, with F2 Logistics Cargo Movers

References

1996 births
University Athletic Association of the Philippines volleyball players
Living people
Liberos
De La Salle University alumni
Philippines women's international volleyball players
Filipino women's volleyball players
Sportspeople from Batangas
People from Tanauan, Batangas
Competitors at the 2017 Southeast Asian Games
Volleyball players at the 2018 Asian Games
Competitors at the 2019 Southeast Asian Games
Asian Games competitors for the Philippines
Competitors at the 2021 Southeast Asian Games
Southeast Asian Games competitors for the Philippines